Leesylvania, formerly known as Neabsco, is a census-designated place in Prince William County in the U.S. state of Virginia.

History
Leesylvania plantation is located nearby in Leesylvania State Park. During the 18th century, Henry Lee II, grandfather of Robert E. Lee, lived in the plantation house with his family and enslaved Africans, growing tobacco on the property. Due to road construction in the 1950s, little of the house's foundation remains.

The CDP was formed as Neabsco (named for Neabsco Creek) in 2000 in an area which was formerly the southern area of Woodbridge. In 2020, the CDP was renamed Leesylvania, after the nearby state park and plantation.

Demographics
In the 2010 Census, Leesylvania, then named Neabsco, had a population of 12,068. As of the 2020 Census, it had a population of 21,193.

Geography
Leesylvania is in southeastern Prince William County and is bordered to the northeast by Woodbridge, to the northwest by Dale City, to the west by Montclair, to the south by Cherry Hill, and to the east by Leesylvania State Park.

The CDP is bisected by Neabsco Creek with Powells Creek passing through at the southern area, both of which flow west—east into the Potomac River near the state park.

Transportation

The central area of Leesylvania lies at the crossroads of U.S. Route 1 (Richmond Highway) and SR 610 (Cardinal Drive/Neabsco Road). The CDP is also served by SR 638 (Neabsco Mills Road/Blackburn Road), SR 784 (Dale Boulevard), and VA 394 (College Drive). Interstate 95 forms the western boundary of the CDP.

Virginia Railway Express service is provided at the nearby Rippon station, and the Potomac and Rappahannock Transportation Commission provides OmniRide bus service in Leesylvania.

Education
Freedom High School and Northern Virginia Community College's Woodbridge campus are located in the CDP of Leesylvania.

References

Census-designated places in Prince William County, Virginia
Washington metropolitan area
Census-designated places in Virginia